David Joseph Tipton (born December 10, 1953) is a former American football defensive tackle in the National Football League. He played for the New England Patriots (1975–1976) and then in the USFL with the Arizona Outlaws in 1985. He played at the collegiate level at Western Illinois University.

See also
New England Patriots players

References

1953 births
Living people
Sportspeople from Superior, Wisconsin
Players of American football from Wisconsin
American football defensive tackles
Western Illinois Leathernecks football players
New England Patriots players